Gregory C. Carr (born 1959) is an American entrepreneur and philanthropist. His main philanthropic venture is the restoration of Mozambique's Gorongosa National Park, which has been ravaged by civil war and environmental destruction. He has pledged more than $100 million over 35 years to restore and protect the park's biodiversity, and to assist communities living adjacent to the park with health care, education and agriculture in a public-private partnership with the Government of Mozambique.

Biography
Greg Carr was born in Idaho Falls, Idaho, in 1959. His parents are Taylor H. and Betty O. Carr. He attended Utah State University as an undergraduate, majoring in history, and received a master's degree in public policy from Harvard Kennedy School in 1986. Later that year, inspired by the breakup of AT&T, he and Scott Jones founded Boston Technology, one of the earlier firms to sell voice mail systems to telephone companies. Carr served as the chair of Boston Technology until it was purchased by Comverse Technology in 1998.

From 1996 to 1998 he was chair of Prodigy, an early global Internet service provider. He also co-founded Africa Online in 1996 and served as its chair until 1998.

In 1998 Carr resigned from his for-profit boards and dedicated himself to humanitarian activities. He was the founding donor to the Carr Center for Human Rights Policy at Harvard University in 1999. Through research and teaching, the Carr Center seeks to make human rights principles central to the formulation of good public policy in the United States and throughout the world.

In 1999 he also founded the Gregory C. Carr Foundation, a non-profit organization through which he has been involved in various projects including the Gorongosa Restoration Project. The Carr Foundation has committed to the 30 year restoration of Gorongosa National Park in central Mozambique as well as to the sustainable development of the communities surrounding the park. The Gorongosa team has reintroduced species to the ecosystem, worked with the Mozambican government to extend the park's boundaries to include Mount Gorongosa and planted more than three million trees on the mountain, created an international restoration ecology science research center, established eco-tourism in the park, and provides health and education programs to the local communities living near the park's borders. National Geographic Television chronicled the park's restoration in their film Africa's Lost Eden, as well as the CBS News program 60 Minutes
 
on October 26, 2008 and December 4, 2022. Carr has frequently been a keynote speaker and panelist on conservation and restoration at universities, conferences, and film festivals. Since 2012, he has guest lectured annually to undergraduate students at Princeton University and was a featured speaker in Princeton's Class of 2014 Last Lectures series. 

In 2000, he co-founded the Museum of Idaho located in Idaho Falls, and in 2001 he opened the Market Theater in Harvard Square, Cambridge, Massachusetts. The theater was known for showcasing small independent and experimental productions. Carr has been active in human rights activities in his home state of Idaho. In 2001, he purchased the compound of the Aryan Nations, near Hayden Lake, Idaho after it was seized by court order following a successful lawsuit brought by the Southern Poverty Law Center against the Nazi group. The land, donated to North Idaho College, is now a park. In 2002 he was the lead donor to the Anne Frank Human Rights Memorial in Boise, Idaho.

He was a close friend of biologist E. O. Wilson and served on the board of the E.O. Wilson Biodiversity Foundation until Wilson's passing on December 26, 2021.

Awards and honors
 Honorary PhD Utah State University. 2003
 Idaho Technology Hall of Fame. 2013
 Honorary PhD Boise State University. 2015

References

External links
Carr Foundation official site
Gorongosa National Park site
The New York Times "New Future for Idaho Aryan Nations Compound" by Sam Howe Verhovek
"The Monkey and the Fish", Philip Gourevitch, The New Yorker, December 21, 2009, p. 98
Carroll, Sean B. (May 22, 2016). "Resurrecting Mozambique's Magnificent Gorongosa". Sierra.
Sun Valley Magazine - Paradise Lost, and Found
The New York Times "In Mozambique, a Living Laboratory for Nature's Renewal"  by Natalie Angier
The New York Times "A Comeback for African National Parks" by Patrick Adams
Independent: "How Gorongosa National Park went from civil war battlefield to conservation leader" by Heather Richardson
National Geographic: "Devastated by war, this African park's wildlife is now thriving - A generation after civil war, more than 100,000 large animals populate Mozambique's Gorongosa National Park, a rare spot of good news" by David Quammen
Associated Press: "In Mozambique, Conservationists Try to Curb Child Marriage"
The New York Times "How Teeth Became Tusks, and Tusks Became Liabilities"
The Guardian: "Women lead the charge in healing scars of war in Mozambique wildlife park"
Nature: "Upgrading protected areas  to conserve wild biodiversity"
VIMEO: Girls Club Gorongosa
VIMEO: Dominique Gonçalves speaking about Gorongosa at National Geographic Society on Half Earth Day, 2017
Princeton University "Ecologists find a 'landscape of fearlessness' in a war-torn savannah"
National Geographic - Why Cyclone Idai was so destructive
National Geographic - Children living near national parks are healthier, more prosperous
The New York Times - Opinion by Thomas L. Friedman
Quammen, David (May 2019). "How one of Africa's great parks is rebounding from war". National Geographic.
Idaho Statesman - This Idahoan's team feeds 20,000 people after cyclone destroyed Gorongosa. Here's how to help
UNDP: Stimulating Growth - Growing coffee to restore the rainforest and lift people out of poverty also reinforces Africa's greatest wildlife restoration initiative
Idaho Statesman - Zoo Boise set to open its first exhibit in more than a decade. Here's what you'll see.
Idaho Statesman - A people ravaged by civil war found new life in Idahoan's team's effort to plant coffee
Associated Press - Mozambique peace accord brings hope of economic growth
The New York Times "Wild Pups Romp Again in an African Paradise" by Natalie Angier
Associated Press - Coffee growers help reforest Mozambique's Mount Gorongosa
Matthews, Cate (2019). "Greatest Places 2019: Gorongosa National Park". Time.
Associated Press - Thousands in Mozambique rebuild after devastating cyclones
Seasons Greetings from Gorongosa Park - Message by Greg Carr
Wired - The wild experiment to bring apex predators back from the brink
CNN Travel: Inside Africa - The women behind the comeback: How one of Africa's national parks is thriving after war
Mountain Journal - The Awakening: How Hope Was Reborn In Gorongosa
The New York Times "How This Spot (in Mozambique) Got Its Leopard"
Africa Geographic: "Gorongosa"
Greg Carr remarks at Boise City Club
Independent "The National Park that survived a war"

Corporate executives
American human rights activists
Harvard Kennedy School alumni
Utah State University alumni
People from Idaho Falls, Idaho
1959 births
Living people
Philanthropists from Idaho
Businesspeople from Idaho
20th-century American businesspeople
21st-century American businesspeople